Government Sadiq Dane High School, also known as S. D. High School, is a high school located in Bahawalpur, Punjab, Pakistan. It is the largest school in Bahawalpur with over 2000 students currently enrolled. The building of the school is well-known for its clocks.

History

The building of the school was established by Nawab of Bahawalpur in 1911 as Sadiq Darul Aqama. The building has a clock that was made by the Bing Bang Company of Britain. The school was inaugrated by Louis Dane on February 13, 1911, and is named after him and Nawab of Bahawalpur.

References

Bahawalpur (princely state)
Tourist attractions in Bahawalpur
Schools in Bahawalpur
1911 establishments in British India